Live from Las Vegas may refer to:

 Britney Spears Live from Las Vegas, a DVD collection from pop music singer Britney Spears
 Live from Las Vegas (Frank Sinatra album), a 2005 live album by the American singer Frank Sinatra
 Live from Las Vegas (Dean Martin album), a live album of a 1967 performance by Dean Martin at the Sands Hotel in Las Vegas, released in 2005
Live from Las Vegas, album from Nancy Wilson discography 2005

See also
iTunes Live from Las Vegas at the Palms (Yellowcard album), a live album by American pop punk band Yellowcard, recorded 2007 and released 2008
iTunes Live from Las Vegas Exclusively at the Palms, a live album by the indie rock band My Morning Jacket released 2009
Live in Las Vegas (disambiguation)